= List of English and British monarchs =

List of English and British monarchs may refer to:

- List of English monarchs (927–1707)
- List of British monarchs (1707–present)
